The Sumathi Best Teledrama Lyrics Award is presented annually in Sri Lanka by the Sumathi Group of Campany associated with many commercial brands for the best Sri Lankan lyrics of the year in television screen.

The award was first given in 1995. In 2009, the award was not given. Following is a list of the winners of this prestigious title since then.

References

Lyrics
Songwriting awards